Ori Pfeffer (born July 28, 1975) is an Israeli actor. He starred as Detective Golan Cohen in the TV-series Dig and in the movie Hacksaw Ridge.

Personal life 

Pfeffer was born in Jerusalem, Israel.  He served as a soldier in the Israel Defense Forces.

He married Israeli model and television host Yael Goldman in 2009. They have 3 children together.

Partial filmography 

2001: Night Class as Richie
2001: Jewel of the Sahara (Video short) as Mahmud
2002: Bark! as Thief Guy
2002: Apartment #5C as Uri
2004: Shallow Ground as Curtis
2005: Rx as Raul
2005: Munich as Andre Spitzer
2006: Danika as Bank Robber #1
2007: Gardener of Eden as Uri
2008: You Don't Mess with the Zohan as Second Commander
2009: Ultimatum as Yariv
2010: Holy Rollers as Israeli Gangster
2013: A Strange Course of Events as Saul
2013: World War Z as Israeli Camp Refugee
2014: Princess as Michael
2014: Suicide as Moshe Chechik
2014: Tubianski
2015: Dig (TV Series) as Detective Golan Cohen
2016: Hacksaw Ridge as Irv Schecter
2017: Kimaat Mefursemet
2017: The Hitman's Bodyguard as Vacklin
2017: The Testament as Yoel
2017: The Legend of King Solomon as Salim (voice)
2017: Bullet Head as The Handler
2018: 211 as Tre
2018: Noble Savage as Elkayam
2018: The Angel as Zvi Zamir
2019: Angel Has Fallen as Agent Murphy
2019: Full Gas
2021: Jolt as Delacroix
2021: The Protégé as Athens

References

External links 
 

Living people
Israeli male film actors
Israeli male television actors
Israeli Ashkenazi Jews
1975 births